"Lester Leaps In" is a jazz standard originally recorded by Count Basie's Kansas City Seven in 1939. The composition, credited to the group's tenor saxophone player Lester Young, is a head arrangement based on the chord progression of "I Got Rhythm", and serves as a vehicle for interweaving solos by Young and Basie.

Eddie Jefferson, pioneer of vocalese, wrote lyrics for the composition, calling his version "I Got the Blues".

Critical acclaim
"Lester Leaps In" is listed among the Milestone Recordings in American Music at the Three Perfect Minutes site.
jazz.com gives "Lester Leaps In" a 98, on a scale of 100 – "Classic performance. A 'must have' for jazz fans."

Personnel (original 1939 recording)
 Count Basie - piano
 Lester Young - tenor saxophone
 Buck Clayton - trumpet
 Dicky Wells - trombone
 Freddie Green - guitar
 Walter Page - bass
 Jo Jones - drums

Other recordings 
In 1960 Harry James released a version on his album Harry James...Today (MGM E-3848).

References 

Songs about jazz
Songs about musicians
Cultural depictions of jazz musicians
Count Basie
1930s jazz standards
1939 songs